Cavanagh and Cavanagh was an architectural partnership in Australia, active in both Western Australia and Queensland. The partners were brothers Michael Cavanagh and James Cavanagh.

History 
In 1900 Michael Cavanagh was joined by his younger brother, James as partners in the architectural practice, Cavanagh and Cavanagh. The firm had a long association with the Catholic Church, designing a number of hospitals, schools and churches.

Significant works 
 1901: St Joseph's Boys' Orphanage (Clontarf Aboriginal College)
 1902: P&O Hotel, Fremantle
 1902: St Mary's Roman Catholic Church, Kalgoorlie 
 1902: Orient Hotel, Fremantle
 1902 Manning Buildings & Chambers, Fremantle
 1903: Redemptorist Monastery, North Perth
 1909: Fremantle Fire Station
 1909: St Anne’s Croatian Roman Catholic Church, North Fremantle 
 1915: St Brigid's Covent, North Perth
 1923: Alterations and additions to St Mary's Cathedral, Perth
 1923: Completion of St Patricks Church, Gympie
 1923: St Patrick's Church, Katanning 
 1927: Major alternations to Tara House (Irish Club) in Brisbane
 1929: Extensions to St. Mary's Catholic Church, South Brisbane
 1931: Hibernian Hall, Roma, Queensland
 1931: Mt Hawthorn Hotel (Paddington Ale House), Mt Hawthorn
 1935: St Nicholas Russian Orthodox Cathedral, Brisbane 
 1937: Rostrevor Flats, Perth (now entrance to Mercedes College, Perth) 
 1937: Alterations and additions to Victoria Hotel, Toodyay

References

External links 
 

Architects from Western Australia